Hānaiakamalama or Queen Emma Summer Palace, served as a retreat for Queen Emma of Hawaii from 1857 to 1885, as well as for her husband King Kamehameha IV, and their son, Prince Albert Edward. It is a now a historic landmark, museum, and tourist site located at 2913 Pali Highway, less than a ten-minute drive outside of downtown Honolulu, Hawaii. The museum is open daily from 9:00 a.m. to 4:00 p.m., and is maintained with entrance fees, revenue from the gift shop, and other funds raised by the Daughters of Hawaii.

History 
Hānaiakamalama is located in the Nuuanu Valley, long a popular location first for Hawaiian chiefs and royalty, and later for non-Hawaiian residents, who found the cooler climate of the uplands more comfortable than downtown Honolulu. The Hawaiian name means either the Southern Cross or is the name of a benevolent goddess.The frame of the home was built in Boston, in 1848, and shipped to Hawaii via Cape Horn.  It was then assembled on a property purchased by John Lewis from the Kingdom of Hawaii .  It had six rooms, one story, and a porch with Doric columns in the Greek Revival style.

In 1850, two years after it was completed, the home was purchased at auction by Keoni Ana (John Young II) for $6,000. Young owned the estate until 1857, when he gave it to his niece, Queen Emma. In 1869, Queen Emma added a large room called the Edinburgh Room to the rear of the structure, in preparation for the visit of the Duke of Edinburgh.

After Queen Emma's death in 1885, the Kingdom of Hawaii bought the estate. In 1911, Territorial Governor Walter F. Frear declared it a park to be maintained by the City and County of Honolulu. At one point, plans were made to build a baseball park over the site. However, the Daughters of Hawaii were able to acquire the building and have since restored and maintained it as a museum. The site was placed on the National Register of Historic Places in the 1970s.

 Current status 

Today, Queen Emma's Summer Palace sits on a  plot owned by the Queen Emma Estate, and maintained by the Daughters of Hawaii. The grounds are extensively landscaped, with many plants native to the Hawaiian Islands.

The house itself is a museum displaying Queen Emma's possessions, along with those of her husband, King Kamehameha IV, their son, Prince Albert Edward, and other members of the Hawaiian royal families. The rooms and their principal contents are as follows:

 Entrance Hall - feather standards (kāhili); royal coat of arms.
 Front Bedroom (originally the Dining Room) - Large bed of Acacia koa; Prince Albert's cradle; Queen Emma's sleigh bed; Prince Albert Edward's bathtub
 Parlor - Queen Emma's baby grand piano; 3 feather capes; koa dining table and chairs; imari porcelain jardinière given by Emperor Meiji to King Kalākaua
 Cloak Room - Royal feather cloak
 Back Bedroom - Queen Emma's koa bed; Prince Albert Edward's koa crib; display cabinet with Prince Albert's velvet suit, etc.
 Center Hall - Silver christening vessel given by Queen Victoria; tiger claw necklace; stereopticon given by Napoleon III on Queen Emma's visit to France in 1865; kapa cloth artifacts; feather standards (kāhili)
 Edinburgh Room - Royal cabinet with china given by Queen Victoria; rosewood furniture; piano; chair and settee

The house also contains a number of portraits of historical interest. Subjects include William Charles Lunalilo, John Young II, Julia Alapai, Bernice Pauahi Bishop, Kamehameha III, Kamehameha IV, Kamehameha V, Queen Emma of Hawaii, Prince Albert Edward Kauikeaouli, etc.

 Nearby sites of interest 
Not far from Hānaiakamalama is the Pali Lookout, site of the battle of Nuʻuanu Pali, where Kamehameha I defeated the forces of the King of Oahu, consolidating his claim as monarch of the Hawaiian Islands.

 References 

 Queen Emma Summer Palace'' (brochure), Daughters of Hawaii

External links 

Daughters of Hawaii - Queen Emma Summer Palace

Royal residences in Hawaii
Houses on the National Register of Historic Places in Hawaii
Historic house museums in Hawaii
Museums in Honolulu
Houses in Honolulu County, Hawaii
Historic American Buildings Survey in Hawaii
National Register of Historic Places in Honolulu